Amphicyon ("ambiguous dog") is an extinct genus of large carnivorous bone-crushing mammals, popularly known as bear dogs, of the family Amphicyonidae, subfamily Amphicyoninae, from the Burdigalian Epoch until the late Pliocene. Members of this family received their vernacular name for possessing bear-like and dog-like features.

Morphology

Amphicyon was the typical bear-dog amphicyonid with morphology similar to both bears and dogs. With its robust build and maximum length of 2.5 m (8 ft), the largest species looked more like a bear than a dog. It had a large heavy tail, thick neck, robust limbs and teeth like a wolf. The Amphicyon was very large for predators of its time but this advantage eventually became a disadvantage because its large body mass was too large to take faster prey.

Behaviour
Amphicyon was long believed to have been an omnivore, but to have tended to eat more meat than plants or other foods. However, in a new study published in 2020, examination of the relative grinding area of the molars of Amphicyon indicates that it was predominantly or purely carnivorous, similar to most living canids. Both Amphicyon and its relative, Ischyrocyon, possessed skeletal features that are characteristic of both living ambush and pursuit predators. As such, it is believed that Amphicyon probably pursued prey for longer distances but at slower speeds than living ambush predators do. Upon catching up to its prey, Amphicyon probably grabbed its victims with its powerfully muscled forelimbs before killing them by tearing into the prey's ribcage or neck using its large, strong canines set in its narrow snout.

It is generally believed that Amphicyon lived on its own, unlike wolves. It is thought to have targeted slow or injured large prey like the Chalicotherium to feed its large appetite.

Fossil distribution
Amphicyon has also been found in France and Spain  in Europe. Amphicyon'''s youngest range is on the Indian subcontinent, where it disappeared only in the late Pliocene.

Specimens have been found in across Europe and in western Turkey. The species was named by De Blainville in 1841. A. major was large in size, comparable to a modern lion or tiger. The estimated mass of A. major is around 180 kg (397 lb) with the functions derived for limb bones and craniodental measurements.Amphicyon giganteus was a widespread European species that lived during the early Burdigalian to early Langhian, from approximately 20.4–15.9 Mya, with possible material from Namibia. The species was first described in 1884 by Kaup. A specimen of Iberotherium rexmanueli zbyszewskii with teeth marks from A. giganteus was found in Portugal. It is unknown if the young Iberotherium was attacked or the carcass found and scavenged. The find was described by paleontologists Antunesa et al. in 2006.Amphicyon galushai represents the first occurrence of Amphicyon in North America, approximately 18.8–17.5 Mya during the early Hemingfordian. Described by Robert M. Hunt Jr. in 2003, it is mostly known from fossils found in the Runningwater Formation of western Nebraska and includes a complete adult skull, a partial juvenile skull, 3 mandibles and teeth and postcranial elemenents representing least 15 individuals. There is an additional skull fragment from the Troublesome Formation of Colorado. A. galushai is considered ancestral to the late Hemingfordian species, Amphicyon frendens.A. frendens lived during the late Hemingfordian, 17.5–15.9 Mya. The species was originally described by W. Matthew in 1924 from specimens found in the middle member of the Sheep Creek Formation, Sioux County, Nebraska. A. frendens specimens have since been found at sites in Harney and Malheur Counties, Oregon. The species was originally described by W. Matthew in 1924 from specimens found in the Olcott Formation, Sioux County, Nebraska. Specimens attributed to this species have since been found in California, Colorado and New Mexico.Amphicyon palaeindicus is known from the Bugti Hills in Pakistan. It was first described by Richard Lydekker in 1876. The exact age of the fossil sites from which it was recovered is unclear, though they seem to range from the late Oligocene to the late Miocene. Its status as an actual species is unclear, as nearly all remains attributed to Amphicyon in the region were attributed to it.Amphicyon lydekkeri is known from the Dhok Pathan horizon in Pakistan. It was originally described by Pilgrim in 1910 and attributed to its own genus, Arctamphicyon. However, the differences between "Arctamphicyon" and Amphicyon may ultimately be negligible, and it is most likely part of the genus. With the Dhok Pathan deposits dating to the late Pliocene, Amphicyon lydekkeri'' is the youngest amphicyonid known.

References

Bear dogs
Oligocene caniforms
Miocene bear dogs
Miocene mammals of Asia
Miocene mammals of North America
Aquitanian genus first appearances
Tortonian extinctions
Fossil taxa described in 1836
Prehistoric carnivoran genera